Rosa Castillo Varó (born 12 December 1974) is a former Spanish footballer. She played throughout her career as a right winger for CD Híspalis and Levante UD with whom she won three leagues and six national cups. Since 2011 she is the coordinator of the latter.

She was a member of the Spain women's national football team, and played the 1997 European Championship.

International goals
 Torneig Internacional Ciutat de Tarragona
 1 in Spain 2–2 Poland (1993)
 1995 UEFA Women's Championship
 1 in Spain 17–0 Slovenian (1994)
 1 in Roumania 2–2 Spain (1996)

References

Spanish women's footballers
1974 births
Living people
Spain women's international footballers
Primera División (women) players
Levante UD Femenino players
Footballers from Andalusia
People from Barbate
Sportspeople from the Province of Cádiz
Women's association football midfielders